Edmilsa Governo (born 28 February 1998) is a Mozambican athlete, who won a bronze medal in the women's 400 metres T12 event at the 2016 Summer Paralympics. She also won a gold medal in the 200 metres T12 event at the 2015 African Games, and a bronze medal in the 400 metres T12 event at the 2015 IPC Athletics World Championships.

Personal life
Governo was born on 28 February 1998 in Maputo, Mozambique. She started racing at the age of 8. Governo has cited fellow Mozambican athlete Maria Mutola, who competed at six Olympic Games as an inspiration.

Career
In 2015, Governo won the 200 metres T12 event at the 2015 African Games, and came third in the 400 metres T12 race at the 2015 IPC Athletics World Championships in Doha, Qatar. In 2016, she won the 200 metres T12 event at the IPC Athletics Grand Prix in Tunis, Tunisia.

At the age of 18, Governo competed at the 2016 Summer Paralympics. She was the only Mozambican athlete at the Games, and as such was the country's flag bearer at the Parade of Nations. She competed in the women's 100 metres T12 and 400 metres T12 races. In the semi-finals of the 400 metres T12 event, she set an African continental record time of 54.99 seconds. Her time was the third quickest time of the round. In the final, Governo broke the African continental record again, finishing third in a time of 53.89 seconds. She lost to Ukrainian Oksana Boturchuk in a sprint finish; Boturshuk finished second in the race. Governo was Mozambique's first medalist at a Paralympic Games. In the 100 metres T12 event, Governo came third in her semi-final, in a national record time of 12.35. She did not qualify for the final. In 2017, Governo failed to qualify for the 2017 World Para Athletics Championships in London.

Governo and Hilario Chavela were Mozambique's flag bearers at the 2020 Summer Paralympics Parade of Nations. At the delayed Games, she came last in her heat in the 100 metres T13 event. She won her 400 metres T13 heat in an African record time of 55.50 seconds, and finished fifth in the final.

Honours
In 2015, Governo was named Mozambique's female sportsperson of the year, at the country's Gala Nacional do Desporto (National Sports Gala).

References

External links
 Paralympics
 A picture of her

Living people
Paralympic athletes of Mozambique
Medalists at the 2016 Summer Paralympics
Year of birth uncertain
1998 births
Mozambican female sprinters
Athletes (track and field) at the 2016 Summer Paralympics